Lily Cheng is a Canadian politician who was elected to represent Ward 18 Willowdale on Toronto City Council in the 2022 Toronto municipal election.

Background 
Cheng first became known as founder of North York Moms, an online discussion forum for mothers in the Willowdale area. In 2018, she organized a march through the neighbourhood to reclaim Yonge Street and advocate for public safety in the neighbourhood following the 2018 Toronto van attack. Prior to her election in 2022, she also served as the executive director of the NeighbourLink North York food bank.

Political career 
Cheng ran against incumbent councillor John Filion in the 2018 Toronto municipal election. Filion had originally intended not to run again that year, and had in fact endorsed Cheng as his successor in the former Ward 29, however, after the provincial government of Doug Ford passed legislation cutting the size of the city council in half by aligning ward boundaries with provincial and federal electoral district boundaries in the city, Filion changed his mind and ran again, winning the seat over Cheng.

2022 election 
Following Filion's retirement from politics in 2022 she ran again, winning the seat over Filion's former chief of staff Markus O'Brien Fehr. She campaigned largely on issues of housing in the ward, including opposing a controversial supportive housing development on Cummer Avenue and lobbying for greater community input into a municipal plan to lease a hotel in the ward as an emergency homeless shelter.

Cheng won the seat following the October 24 election and took office on November 15.

Election results

References 

Toronto city councillors
Women municipal councillors in Canada
21st-century Canadian politicians
21st-century Canadian women politicians
Women in Ontario politics
Living people
Year of birth missing (living people)